El hotel de los secretos is a Mexican telenovela produced by Roberto Gómez Fernández for Televisa. It is an adaptation of the Spanish series Gran Hotel created by Ramón Campos, Gema R. Neira and Carlos Sedes.

The series stars Irene Azuela as Isabel, Erick Elías as Julio, Daniela Romo as Ángela and Diana Bracho as Doña Teresa.

Plot 
A young man of humble origins travels to the Gran Hotel located on the outskirts of a village called San Cristóbal Tlaxico to visit his sister Cristina, who works as the floor supervisor of the hotel. Upon arrival, Julio discovers that more than a month after being dismissed for allegedly stealing from the hotel, nobody knows anything of her.

Julio decides to stay and work as a waiter to investigate her disappearance. He befriends Isabel Alarcón, one of the daughters of the owner of the hotel Doña Teresa Alarcón .

Cast

Main 
 Irene Azuela as Isabel Alarcón
 Erick Elías as Julio Olmedo
 Daniela Romo as Ángela Gómez
 Diana Bracho as Teresa de Alarcón

Also main 
Jorge Poza as Diego Montejo
Carlos Rivera as Andrés Salinas
Dominika Paleta as Sofia Alarcón
Alejandro de la Madrid as Alfredo Vergara
 Ilse Salas as Belén García
 Pablo Cruz Guerrero as Felipe Alarcón
 Jesús Ochoa as Serapio Ayala
 Eduardo España as Dagoberto Suárez
 Juan Carlos Barreto as Lupe
 Luis Gatica as Genaro
 Claudia Rios as Melibea
 Queta Lavat as Señora Limantour
 Josh Gutiérrez as Jacinto
 Arantza Ruiz as Violeta
 Rodrigo Virago as Pascual
 Ilse Ikeda as Natalia
 Sergio Gallardo as Mateo
 Marlene Kalb as Victoria
 María Penella
 Silvia Mariscal as Elisa
 Luis Couturier as Benjamín Nieto

Recurring 
 Regina Blandón as Matilde
 Juan Ferrara as Lázaro
 Claudia Ramírez as Cecilia Gaitán
 Sofía Castro as Eugenia

Guest stars 
Ximena Herrera as Cristina Olmedo

Production 
The start of production was confirmed on October 26, 2015, in the forum 10 of Televisa San Ángel, and concluded on May 16, 2016. The production team and the cast lasted seven months recording the telenovela. The series was recorded with film technique and the directors of photography were Luis García and Diego Tenorio; The stage direction was the responsibility of Francisco Franco and Ana Lorena Pérez-Ríos. For the costumes 250 people were involved to create more than 13 thousand pieces.

Development 
The series is set in Mexico at the beginning of the 20th century. The main stage where the telenovela is developed was a building of neoclassical architecture, whose construction dates from 1910 and that at the time hosted the largest psychiatric in Mexico. La Castañeda, which is currently located in Amecameca, State of Mexico, was the main location for the development of the series. Santa María Regla, Hidalgo, was the stage that was adapted principally for the town that appeared in the series. In order to create the town in Santa Maria, scenarios such as canteen, offices, a brothel, a bakery, a telegraph, a pharmacy, the market, the seamstress's house, a shop and street stands were recreated. The series was recorded in several locations such as; Mexico City, Morelos, Hidalgo, Mexico state, Aguascalientes, and in forums of Televisa San Ángel.

Music 

The first soundtrack of the series, titled El hotel de los secretos, was released on June 21, 2016.

Track listing

Awards and nominations

References

Mexican telenovelas
Televisa telenovelas
2016 telenovelas
2016 Mexican television series debuts
2016 Mexican television series endings
Blim TV original programming
Mexican television series based on Spanish television series
Spanish-language telenovelas